The Mutual Benefit Life Building is a 25-floor high rise office building at 1845 Walnut Street on Rittenhouse Square in Center City Philadelphia, 19103.

It was designed by Eggers & Higgins and completed in 1972. The building was originally built by the now defunct Mutual Benefit Life Insurance Company of Newark, New Jersey. It is built over a former Philadelphia Parking Authority parking garage now operated by Parkway Corporation. The building was placed on the Philadelphia Register of Historic Places in 1995.

References

External links

 Emporis: Mutual Benefit Life Building — Philadelphia
 Phila. building bought by Resource Properties
 1845 Walnut Street -- Philadelphia Architects and Buildings
 N.J. INSURANCE FIRM BIDS FOR CITY GARAGE
 Philadelphia Parking Authority - 1845 Walnut

Skyscraper office buildings in Philadelphia

Office buildings completed in 1972